Sembakung Murut, or Sembakung, and also known as Tinggalan, is one of several Sabahan languages of Borneo spoken by the Tidong people.

References

Murutic languages
Languages of Sabah
Languages of Indonesia
Languages of Malaysia
Endangered Austronesian languages